Theta Ophiuchi, Latinized from θ Ophiuchi, is a multiple star system in the equatorial constellation of Ophiuchus. It lies on the "right foot" of the serpent-bearer, just southwest of Kepler's Star, the nova of 1604. According to Richard H. Allen's Star Names: Their Lore and Meaning (1899), θ Oph together with ξ Oph formed the Sogdian Wajrik "the Magician", the Khorasmian Markhashik "the Serpent-bitten" and with η Oph the Coptic Tshiō, "the Snake", and Aggia, "the Magician". This star has an apparent visual magnitude of +3.3, making it readily visible to the naked eye. It is 1.8 degrees south of the ecliptic.

Theta Ophiuchi appears to be a triple star system. The brightest component is a spectroscopic binary with an orbital period of 56.71 days and an eccentricity of 0.17. The third component is 5.5 magnitude star with a stellar classification of B5. Its angular separation from the binary pair is 0.15 arcseconds. This system is a proper motion member of the Upper Scorpius sub-group in the Scorpius–Centaurus OB association, the nearest such co-moving association of massive stars to the Sun.

The primary component of this system is a variable star of the Beta Cephei type with a period of just 3h 22m. It has nearly nine times the mass of the Sun and more than six times the Sun's radius. Although only 21 million years old, it has begun to evolve away from the main sequence and has become a subgiant star with a stellar classification of B2 IV. This massive star is radiating around 5,000 times the luminosity of the Sun from its outer atmosphere at an effective temperature of about 22,260 K, giving it the blue-white hue of a B-type star.

References 

B-type subgiants
Beta Cephei variables
3
Upper Scorpius

Ophiuchi, Theta
Ophiuchus (constellation)
Durchmusterung objects
Ophiuchi, 42
157056
084970
6453